Myotubularin is a protein that in humans is encoded by the MTM1 gene.

This gene is a member of a gene family that encodes lipid phosphatases. Myotubularin is required for muscle cell differentiation and mutations in this gene have been identified as being responsible for X-linked myotubular myopathy.

References

Further reading

External links
  GeneReviews/NCBI/NIH/UW entry on X-Linked Myotubular Myopathy or Centronuclear Myopathy

Human proteins